Stay-C is the second album of Akademi Fantasia season 6 winner Stacy which was launched on 9 September 2011 in Malaysia. The album is produced by Astro and distributed by Warner Music.

Track-listing

Collaboration 
 "Gempur" is a collaboration between Stacy and Amy Search, Rock and Roll legend of the Malaysian music industry.

Promotion 
 Stacy performed her single, "Kisah Dongeng" in various JomHeboh Concerts (tour concerts by TV3) nationwide. She also performed at The Music, Art, Style International Festival (MASiF) 2011. Besides that, "Kisah Dongeng" was also performed on Muzik-Muzik (during the nomination stage), where she made it into semi-final round of the Anugerah Juara Lagu.
 The music video of "Kasanova" was premiered on 11/11/11 at 11 p.m. on Astro Ria. The music video features Stacy dancing with back-up dancers at various location. She also performed the song live at the 18th Anugerah Industri Muzik on 12 November 2011.
 Music video for her third single, "Pelangi Senja" was shot at Semporna, Sabah. The video was directed by Ghaz Abu Bakar and nominated for "Best Video" at the 19th Anugerah Industri Muzik.

Awards and nominations

References 

2011 albums
Stacy (singer) albums
Warner Music Group albums
Malay-language albums